The 2010 Copa Petrobras Montevideo was a professional tennis tournament played on outdoor red clay courts. It was the sixth edition of the tournament which is part of the 2010 ATP Challenger Tour. It took place in Montevideo, Uruguay between 27 September and 3 October 2010.

ATP entrants

Seeds	

 Rankings are as of September 20, 2010.

Other entrants
The following players received wildcards into the singles main draw:
  Ariel Behar
  Guilherme Clézar
  Martín Cuevas
  Agustín Velotti

The following players received entry from the qualifying draw:
  Rafael Camilo
  Guillermo Durán
  Jonathan Gonzalia
  Agustín Picco

Champions

Singles

 Máximo González def.  Pablo Cuevas, 1–6, 6–3, 6–4

Doubles

 Carlos Berlocq /  Brian Dabul def.  Máximo González /  Sebastián Prieto, 7–5, 6–3

External links
Official site of Copa Petrobras de Tênis
ITF Search 

Copa Petrobras Montevideo
Clay court tennis tournaments
Tennis tournaments in Uruguay
Uruguay Open
2010 in Uruguayan tennis